The 2012 Men's World Junior Squash Championships is the men's edition of the 2012 World Junior Squash Championships, which serves as the individual world Junior championship for squash players. The event took place at the Khalifa International Tennis and Squash Complex in Doha in Qatar from 7 to 12 July 2012. Marwan El Shorbagy won his second World Junior Open title, defeating Mohamed Abouelghar in the final round.

Seeds

Draw and results

Finals

Top half

Section 1

Section 2

Bottom half

Section 1

Section 2

See also
Men's World Junior Team Squash Championships 2012
Women's World Junior Squash Championships 2012
British Junior Open Squash
World Junior Squash Championships

References

External links
World Junior Squash Championships 2012 official website

World Junior Squash Championships
W
2012 in Qatari sport
21st century in Doha
Squash tournaments in Qatar
Sports competitions in Doha
International sports competitions hosted by Qatar